Bien Hoa Sugar Joint Stock Company (VN:BHS) is a sugar company located in Biên Hòa of Đồng Nai Province in Vietnam.  The company was founded as the "400 Tons Sugar Factory" in 1969 and received its current name in 1994.  The company was equitized in 2001 as a joint stock company.  Bien Hoa operates a cane sugar mill and produces raw sugar, refined sugar, liqueurs and wine, ramen noodles and microorganism fertilizer.

See also
Sugarcane
Molasses
List of companies in Vietnam

External links
Bien Hoa Sugar official homepage
Bien Hoa Sugar at Alacrastore
Bien Hoa Sugar at Bloomberg
Bien Hoa Sugar JSC at Google finance
Bien Hoa Sugar at Ho Chi Minh Securities Trading Center

References

Vietnamese companies established in 1969
Companies listed on the Ho Chi Minh City Stock Exchange
Agriculture companies of Vietnam
Sugar companies
Bien Hoa